James Hay Partnership is a provider of financial services products in the UK with headquarters in Salisbury. The company is best known for administering Self Invested Personal Pensions  (SIPPs) introduced in the Finance Act 1989 by the UK Chancellor of the Exchequer, Nigel Lawson in his commons speech.

History 

James Hay was founded in 1979 and incorporated in 1990 before becoming part of Abbey National (now Santander UK) in 1994. In 2010, Santander sold James Hay to its current parent, the IFG Group PLC, for a reported £35m.

James Hay became the largest provider of SIPPs in the UK during 2001 following a dramatic period of growth in the demand for these flexible pension products. James Hay performed the trustee administration for a number of insurance companies who offer SIPPs to their customers who are often introduced via IFAs (Independent Financial Advisers). In 2014 James Hay evolved its SIPP to include other non-pension wrappers such as general investment accounts (GIAs) and individual savings accounts (ISAs). The IFG Group owned several Adviser companies including London-based Saunderson House. In March 2014 IFG Group sold a number of these companies in order to focus on the James Hay and Saunderson House business units. 

James Hay won the MoneyAge SIPP Provider of The Year award in 2020

Operations 
The company's parent, the IFG Group, was listed on the London Stock Exchange but was sold to private equity house Epiris for £206m in 2019  

James Hay Partnership has headquarters in Salisbury where it employs around 500 staff. It also has offices in London and Bristol. Overall it employs around 600 people in the UK.

References

External links 

Official James Hay website
IFG Group website

Financial services companies of the United Kingdom
Financial services companies established in 1979